Jerry Morton is a fictional character from the British ITV soap opera Coronation Street, played by Michael Starke. He was introduced in March 2007. It was announced in April 2008 that Jerry and the rest of the Mortons would leave the show later in 2008.

Storylines
Jerry arrived in Coronation Street with his family in March 2007, moving in and opening a new takeaway shop on the street. He immediately clashed with next door neighbour Gail Platt as he was constantly playing his music at full volume. He relied heavily upon his eldest daughter Jodie to care for his younger children – Darryl, Mel, Kayleigh and Finlay – and run the kebab shop, leading to her departure in November that year. He began a romance with Eileen Grimshaw, which ended after several months when she told him she felt she was becoming a surrogate mother to his children, and had no desire to assume that role.

Jerry suffered a heart attack in May 2008, prompting Kayleigh to call his estranged wife Teresa Bryant. At first Jerry was horrified to see her but eventually conceded that he needed her help. Teresa moved in, much to Mel's displeasure, but soon outstayed her welcome. In a bid to ensure Jerry would not force her to leave, she took control of his medication and deliberately kept him ill, so he would rely on her. By August 2008, Teresa's tampering had taken its toll and Jerry collapsed, banging his head on the coffee table as he fell and knocking himself unconscious. He was taken to hospital, where his family learnt that he could die but he came round at the beginning of September and Teresa confessed to Jerry. He was horrified by her betrayal. Jerry now refuses to see Teresa and this led to Mel arresting Teresa for attempted murder but Jerry refused to make a statement so Teresa could not be charged. On 26 September 2008, Jerry told his family that he wanted them to move to Spain. After the scandal with Teresa, he yearned for a new start for the sake of his kids and his health. Mel and Darryl chose to stay as she had recently qualified as a police officer and he did not want to leave his friends and wanted to run the chip/kebab shop. Disappointed about their decisions but fully understanding, he left Coronation Street on 29 September 2008 with his younger children Kayleigh and Finlay, bound for a new life.

On 14 November, Dev Alahan phoned Jerry in Spain and made him an offer on the Kebab shop and within a week, their transaction was complete. On the day the sale of Kebab shop went through, it was revealed Jerry had rented Number 6 to Eddie, Anna and Gary Windass, much to the chagrin of Darryl and Teresa.

Character creation and development

In February 2007, it was announced in various British media, that actor Michael Starke, best known for playing Thomas "Sinbad" Sweeney in the Channel 4 soap Brookside, would be joining the cast of Coronation Street as part of a new family, the Mortons. Jerry Morton – the single father of four children – was being introduced as the owner of a fast food takeaway restaurant. The family has been described as "a brash bunch" and it was reported that a "lot of thought [went] into making them a hit family with the viewers...Everyone is always excited when a new character comes into the show but a whole family gives the writers opportunities and we're sure viewers will love the Mortons.... There’ll be some explosive episodes as the Mortons work their way into the hearts, minds and pockets of Weatherfield’s finest. They’re loud, brash and fun and will bring madness and mayhem to the cobbles." The rest of the Mortons are Jerry's eldest daughter Jodie (Samantha Seager); his teenage twins Darryl and Mel (Jonathan Dixon and Emma Edmondson); youngest Kayleigh (Jessica Barden); and Grandad Morton (Rodney Litchfield).

Commenting on the role, actor Michael Starke said, "There are going to be parallels between them and other families but the show is so unique I'm hoping we'll create our own niche". He has revealed that getting the part on Coronation Street at this stage in his career was "a dream... I pinch myself every morning. I think how many people would like to be playing my character? I'm the luckiest actor I know".

Jerry Morton has been described as "a hard-working man who dotes on his family and has no qualms on dodging the taxman." In an interview, actor Michael Starke has said that Jerry is very outgoing, pushy and totally in charge of his family, "what he says goes." He goes on to say "His kids are the be-all-and-end-all and he'll do anything to support them and keep them going. He has his own set of morals in that respect.... He's not a put upon character... he's a go-getter. He thinks he's a lot younger than he is and he's got an idea of himself that no one else has – that's his talent, he uses it to the best of his ability."

References

Coronation Street characters
Fictional people from Liverpool
Television characters introduced in 2007
Male characters in television